James Timothy Brymn (October 5, 1874 or 1881 – October 3, 1946) was an African-American conductor, arranger, composer, and pianist who generally performed northeastern hot style jazz.  He was usually credited as Lieutenant James Tim Brymn, and was sometimes billed as "Mr. Jazz Himself".

Biography
He was born in Kinston, North Carolina; most sources indicate October 5, 1881, but researchers Bob Eagle and Eric LeBlanc suggest 1874 on the basis of his entry in the 1880 census.  He studied at Christian Institute and Shaw University and received his musical education at the National Conservatory of Music.  With Cecil Mack, he co-wrote a number of popular songs, including "Good Morning, Carrie" (1901), "Josephine, My Jo" (1902), and "Please Go 'Way and Let Me Sleep" (1902).   By 1905, Brymn had written five songs that were used in the Smart Set Company shows:  "Morning Noon and Night", "O-San", "Powhatana", "Travel On", and "Darktown Grenadiers".

He joined the U.S. Army, and was commissioned as a Second Lieutenant, serving throughout the First World War with the 350th Field Artillery.  He became the bandleader of the regimental band, the "Black Devils".  In 1919, Brymn’s Black Devil Orchestra performed at the opening of the Paris Peace Conference, in front of President Woodrow Wilson and General John Pershing, and were later credited with introducing jazz to France.  The all African-American 70 piece orchestra was described at the time as "a military symphony engaged in a battle of jazz."  Willie "The Lion" Smith also served in the 350th Field Artillery Regiment and claimed to have received the nickname of "The Lion" for his bravery while in this unit.

Brymn and his musicians returned to the United States after the war.  Brymn led orchestras at two leading New York City nightclubs, Ziegfeld's Roof Garden and Reisenweber's Jardin de Dance, and made a series of recordings for OKeh Records, including "Daddy Won’t You Please Come Home," "Don’t Tell Your Monkey Man," and "Siren of the Southern Sea."  Later, in the 1920s, he became the musical director at James Reese Europe's Clef Club in Harlem, and for the Broadway theatre show Liza.  With Chris Smith and Cecil Mack, he wrote "The Camel Walk", a popular dance tune in 1925.  In 1933, he joined ASCAP.

Brymn was married possibly five times, to Lillie Smith, a woman known only as Jennie, Daisy Mitchell, Jeannette F. Lucas, and  a woman known only as Dorothy. He died in New York City on October 3, 1946.

See also
 List of jazz arrangers

References

External links

http://www.ibdb.com/person.asp?ID=414280

American music arrangers
American male conductors (music)
American jazz composers
American male jazz composers
American jazz pianists
American male pianists
19th-century births
1946 deaths
Shaw University alumni
20th-century American conductors (music)
20th-century American male musicians
20th-century American pianists